Delivering as One is a United Nations report established by the then UN Secretary-General Kofi Annan in 2005 on the topics of development assistance, humanitarian aid and environmental issues. The panel issued its report in November 2006, and sets out a program of reform of the UN's development operations. It focuses on four main principles: One Leader, One Budget, One Programme and One Office. This effort is mostly led by the United Nations Development Group, a group of 32 United Nations specialised agencies working on International Development issues. As a result, countries — both Government and UN partners — have undertaken efforts to work together more effectively and efficiently. Eight countries—Albania, Cape Verde, Mozambique, Pakistan, Rwanda, Tanzania, Uruguay, and Viet Nam—volunteered to be pilots for the initiative.

See also

 United Nations Sustainable Development Group
 Reform of the United Nations

References

External links
 High Level Panel on UN System-wide Coherence
 Delivering as One documents
 Delivering as One

2006 documents
United Nations Development Group
United Nations reform
United Nations reports
2006 in international relations